The Steps of Pittsburgh refers to the collection of nearly 800 sets of city-owned steps in the City of Pittsburgh, Pennsylvania, in the United States.  Many steps parallel existing roads, but others exist on their own and are classified as city streets and are commonly referred to as "paper streets." Nearly two-thirds of the steps are in low or moderate-income areas. Approximately 450 sets of steps are built on structures and 350 are built into sidewalks, known as "jumpwalks".

The large number of steps are an engineering approach to the topography upon which the City of Pittsburgh is built. According to author Martin Aurand, Pittsburgh "lies unevenly on unruly land". The city is located at the confluence of two rivers which cut through elevated land of the Appalachian Plateau.

Steps have defined Pittsburgh to many of its visitors.  Writing in 1937, war correspondent Ernie Pyle wrote of the steps of Pittsburgh:

Pittsburgh's steps were cataloged by author and University of Pittsburgh professor Bob Regan in the late 1990s and early 00s. He located and documented 739 individual sets of steps, including 44,645 risers, accounting for 24,108 vertical feet. Regan's first book was published by The Local History Company in 2004 and is currently out of print. The second edition, published by Globe Pequot, appeared in 2015 and contains updated content and photographs including a full Appendix that provides the location, steps count, and construction year for each flight. In 2017, The City of Pittsburgh's Department of Mobility and Infrastructure utilized Regan's data to form the basis of the current "City Steps Plan" which is used to determine how public stairways are cared for and remediated by the City.

See also
Alley
Steps of Cincinnati
Step street

References

External links

 Pittsburgh Steps - Collection of photographs.
 Vertical Bridges: Poems and Photographs of City Steps by Paola Corso , a newly released poetry book in 2020 that includes original and archival photographs of city steps from the University of Pittsburgh Library
 Mis.Steps: Our Missed Connections with Pittsburgh's City Steps - Collection of photographs and stories.
 Southwest Airlines Magazine October 2018 - Pittsburgh's Stair Power by Bill Fink (p.78)
 "On the Way Up: City Steps, City Immigrants ," a short video paying tribute to early immigrants who built city steps, those who care for them, and new immigrants to Pittsburgh presented by Steppin Stanzas , a grant-awarded poetry and art project celebrating Pittsburgh city steps
South Side Slopes Trekkers Create Winning Quotes, South Pittsburgh Reporter, October 2018, Steppin Stanzas, a grant-awarded poetry and art project celebrating  Pittsburgh city steps, announces step quote contest winners
 "Perspectives: Grid for Grade" by Paola Corso, Pittsburgh Magazine, July 2018, An author who lived in New York City for 20 years returns to her native Pittsburgh to care for her ailing mother. At first uncertain of her decision, a set of steps helps to make her feel right at home, again.
 Pittsburgh Magazine November 2017 - Pittsburgh City Steps: An Artist Tells Their Stories by Bradford Mumpower
 Post Gazette news story from November 6, 2013
 City of Pittsburgh Steps - Western Pennsylvania Regional Data Center
 The Best Urban Hiking City is… Pittsburgh?, a short documentary film about Pittsburgh's city steps created by local filmmaker Dean Bogdanovic

Transportation buildings and structures in Pittsburgh
Stairways in the United States